Ngonidzashe Dondo (born January 15, 1998), better known as King98, is a Zimbabwean Hip Hop artist based in South Africa.

Biography
King98 was born in Marondera.

King98 started his music career in 2017 when he was still in High School, he released his first single titled SauceMan that year.
In 2019, he launched his first album titled Francesca which featured Davido, Nasty C and Nadia Nakai.

Discography

Singles
SauceMan 2017
Defeat 2018
I Bet 2020
Kachiri ft Diamond Platnumz 2020
Jogodo ft  Jux and Sheby Medicine 2020

Albums
Fransesca

Awards
Best Hip Hop Hustle – Zim Hip Hop Awards 2019
Best Album – Zim Hip Hop Awards 2019
Best Collaboration – Zim Hip Hop Awards 2019
Best Collaboration – Zim Hip Hop Awards 2019
Best Newcomer – Changamire Festival Awards 2020
Best Video of the Year (Wacko ft Davido) - Changamire Festival Awards 2020
Best Coordinated Event (Francesca Album Release) – Changamire Festival Awards 2020
Best Album of the Year – StarFM Music Awards 2020
Best Rising Star – Glamma Awards 2020

References

Zimbabwean musicians
Living people
1998 births